The 2019 Tulsa Roughnecks FC season was the 5th season for Tulsa Roughnecks FC in the USL Championship, the second-tier professional soccer league in the United States and Canada.

This proved to be the team's last season under the Roughnecks FC name. On December 4, 2019, the club name officially changed to FC Tulsa.

Club
As of June 14, 2019

Competitions

Exhibitions

USL Championship

Standings

Match results

The 2019 USL Championship season schedule for the club was announced on December 19, 2018.

Unless otherwise noted, all times in CDT

U.S. Open Cup

As a member of the USL Championship, the Roughnecks entered the tournament in the Second Round, played May 14–15, 2019

References

FC Tulsa seasons
Tulsa Roughnecks
Tulsa Roughnecks
Tulsa